Gomoh Junction, officially known as Netaji Subhas Chandra Bose Gomoh (station code is GMO) is a railway junction station in the Indian state of Jharkhand. Several branch lines start here:  Gomoh–Barkakana branch line, Gomoh–Muri branch line and Adra–Gomoh line. It is located in Dhanbad district in the Indian state of Jharkhand.

Etymology
Gomoh railway station was renamed as  Netaji Subhas Chandra Bose Gomoh railway station in 2009 in honour of Indian freedom fighter and leader Netaji's long journey in Netaji Express (previously known as Kalka Mail) from Gomoh Railway Station out of the British Empire in 1941.

History
The Grand Chord was opened in 1906.
In 1927, the Central India Coalfields Railway opened the Gomoh–Barkakana line. Later, the line was amalgamated with East Indian Railway.

The Nagpur–Asansol line (then considered the main line of Bengal Nagpur Railway) was extended  to Gomoh in 1907.

Electrification
The Dhanbad–Gomoh sector was electrified in 1960−61.

Loco shed

Gomoh Loco Shed has an electric loco shed with capacity to hold 125+ locos. Locos housed at the shed include 53-WAP-7 and 238-WAG-9 locomotives.

References

External links
 Trains at Chandrapura

Railway stations in Bokaro district
Dhanbad railway division
Memorials to Subhas Chandra Bose